Bahubal is an upazila of Habiganj District in the Sylhet Division of Bangladesh.

History
Bahubal was a part of the Tungachhal and Rajpur kingdoms. The last Raja of Tungachhal, Achak Narayan, was defeated in 1303 during the Conquest of Taraf by Syed Nasiruddin and his 12 lascars.

In the 17th century, after Khwaja Usman's departure from Bokainagar Fort, he reached Putijuri in Bahubal. Here, he built a fort at the foot of the Giripal and stationed his brothers, Malhi and Wali, and son, Mumriz in Putia Hill.

The area was historically famous to be the home of fighters and people of physical strength. Famed for sports such as malla-yuddha and lathi khela. One day, a wrestler (Mal) from Dakshinbhag, Moulvibazar, came to this area to fight another wrestler by the name of Qudrat Mal in a game of malla-yuddha. Qudrat defeated the wrestler and made his famous statement, "Bahuka Bol Dekh, Beta". This phrase became famous in the local area and from Bahuka-Bol, the place eventually was shortened to Bahubal. This incident is remembered through a common folk rhyme.

On 20 December 1793, Bahubal became a part of the Lashkarpur District. In 1921, Bahubal was made a thana headquarter.

During the 1950 East Pakistan riots, the village of Silani was attacked at 9 A.M. on 15 February. The mob raised provocative slogans and set fire to many homes. The inhabitants fled to the nearby jungles to save their lives while the others were killed.

Bahubal thana was upgraded to an upazila in 1984.

Geography

It has a total area of 250.66 km2.

Demographics

According to the 2011 Bangladesh census, Bahubal Upazila had 37,334 households and a population of 197,997, 2.0% of whom lived in urban areas. 13.8% of the population was under the age of 5. The literacy rate (age 7 and over) was 39.8%, compared to the national average of 51.8%.

Administration
Bahubal Upazila is divided into seven union parishads: Bahubal, Bhadeshwar, Lamatashi, Mirpur, Putijuri, Satkapan, and Snanghat. The union parishads are subdivided into 146 mauzas and 325 villages.

Education
There are many schools and colleges.

Gallery

See also
 Upazilas of Bangladesh
 Districts of Bangladesh
 Divisions of Bangladesh

References

Upazilas of Habiganj District